Donnie O'Neal Layton (September 18, 1951 – June 28, 2006) was a Canadian football player who played for the Edmonton Eskimos of the Canadian Football League (CFL). He won the Grey Cup with Edmonton in 1975. He played college football at South Carolina State University.

Layton was drafted in the 10th round of the 1975 NFL Draft by the San Francisco 49ers but did not play in the league.

References

1951 births
2006 deaths
American football running backs
Canadian football running backs
Players of Canadian football from South Carolina
Edmonton Elks players
South Carolina State Bulldogs football players
Players of American football from South Carolina
Sportspeople from Spartanburg, South Carolina